Big Boys Don't Cry may refer to:

 Big Boys Don't Cry, a 2000 novella by Tom Kratman
 "Big Boys Don't Cry", a song by Blue System from Walking on a Rainbow
 "Big Boys Don't Cry", a song by Extreme from Extreme
 Big Boys Don't Cry, a 2020 British film

See also
 Boys Don't Cry (disambiguation)
 Big Girls Don't Cry (disambiguation)